Enolmis nevadensis is a moth of the family Scythrididae. It was described by Pietro Passerin d'Entrèves in 1997. It is found in Spain (Sierra Nevada).

Etymology
The species name refers to the type locality, the Sierra Nevada in Spain.

References

Scythrididae
Moths described in 1997